Allen Cohen (born 1951) is an American composer, arranger, conductor, vocal coach, pianist and university professor.

Education
Cohen holds his Bachelor of Arts degree in Music and Drama from Ripon College and Master of Fine Arts in Music Composition from the State University of New York at Purchase. He received a doctorate in composition from the City University of New York, where he studied with Thea Musgrave, Bruce Saylor, and David Del Tredici.

Awards
Allen Cohen has received a Meet the Composer grant and several ASCAP Plus awards.

Compositions
Cohen's work includes music for orchestra, chamber ensembles, solo instruments, and voice. His pieces on compact disc include Autumn Morning for orchestra (Vienna Modern Masters), Duo-Partita for cello and guitar (Artek), Grace for piano solo (New Ariel), Sonata for Trumpet and Piano (Song of Myself) and Wings of Desire for flugelhorn and piano (Capstone). He has written incidental scores for films and off-Broadway plays, and has arranged dance music for five Broadway musicals.

Performance career
He has conducted many operetta and musical theater productions on Broadway and elsewhere, and has performed extensively as a pianist.

Teaching career
Cohen has been teaching various courses at  Fairleigh Dickinson University, where he currently serves as a Professor of Music. Previously, he taught at Hunter College, New York University and Manhattanville College.

Publications
He is the author of Howard Hanson in Theory and Practice (Praeger/Greenwood) and the popular children's book That's So Funny I Forgot to Laugh! (Scholastic), which has sold more than half a million copies, and co-author of Writing Musical Theater (Palgrave Macmillan). His scholarly papers in theory and musical theater has been presented  at conferences in New York City, Hawaii, and Germany.

Cohen has had articles published in The New York Times and The Baker Street Journal.

References

External links
Official website
Biography at  American Composers Forum website
Biography at  Fairleigh Dickinson University's website

Living people
1951 births
American male composers
21st-century American composers
Fairleigh Dickinson University faculty
Manhattanville College faculty
New York University faculty
State University of New York at Purchase alumni
Graduate Center, CUNY alumni
Ripon College (Wisconsin) alumni
21st-century American male musicians